Limnostygis is a dubious genus of tetrapod from the Pennsylvanian of Nova Scotia. The fragmentary holotype specimen was found in a fossilized tree stump in the Morien Group. Formerly thought to be a limnoscelid, this specimen has since been considered to be a combination of possible ophiacodont and captorhinid material.

References 

Carboniferous tetrapods of North America